Love Made Visible is the first EP by British indie band Delays on Fiction Records. It was due to be released on 5 November 2007; however, on Amazon it was released on 12 November 2007. A music video was also made for the title track.

Track listing
CD1746674
 "Love Made Visible"
 "Panic Attacks"
 "Slow Burn"
 "You See Colours"
 "We Together Make a City" (Love Made Visible Torchteam Remix)

References

Delays albums
2007 EPs
Rough Trade Records EPs